Guy Revell (August 2, 1941 - March 11, 1981) was a Canadian pair skater. With skating partner Debbi Wilkes, he became a two-time Canadian national champion, the 1963 North American champion, and the 1964 Olympic silver medallist.

Career 
Revell began skating with Debbi Wilkes, six years his junior, in 1958 after meeting at the Unionville skating carnival. They were coached by Bruce Hyland at Crosby Arena and represented the Unionville Skating Club throughout their career.

Wilkes fell from a lift while posing for press photographs prior to the 1963 World Championships, hitting the ice head-first and fracturing her skull. The pair had to withdraw from the competition.

Wilkes/Revell were awarded the bronze medal at the 1964 Winter Olympics in Innsbruck, while gold went to Ludmila Belousova / Oleg Protopopov and silver to Marika Kilius / Hans-Jürgen Bäumler. After taking the bronze at the 1964 World Championships in Dortmund, the pair parted ways — Wilkes decided to pursue an education while Revell elected to tour professionally in ice shows.

In 1966, Wilkes/Revell were informed that the silver medallists in Innsbruck, Marika Kilius / Hans-Jürgen Bäumler of Germany, had been disqualified after an International Olympic Committee investigation found they had signed pro contracts before the Olympics. IOC executive James Worrall presented Wilkes/Revell with the silver medals during the Canadian Championships in Peterborough, Ont. Later, Kilius/Baumler were reinstated in the record books, but the medals were never redistributed. In December 2013, after an investigation by The New York Times, the International Olympic Committee confirmed that Kilius/Bäumler and Wilkes/Revell share the 1964 Olympic silver medal and Joseph/Joseph of the United States are the bronze medallists. Despite the information on its website over the years, the IOC stated that this was intended to be the official result since 1987.

Revell joined the Ice Capades and had a long career skating professionally with Gertrude Desjardins. Having relatively little formal education, he had difficulty adjusting to life after the end of his performing career and committed suicide in 1981.

Results
(with Wilkes)

References

1941 births
1981 suicides
Canadian male pair skaters
Olympic figure skaters of Canada
Figure skaters at the 1964 Winter Olympics
Olympic medalists in figure skating
World Figure Skating Championships medalists
Medalists at the 1964 Winter Olympics
Olympic silver medalists for Canada
Suicides in British Columbia
20th-century Canadian people